Sjumansholmen is the smallest island of the Southern Gothenburg Archipelago serviced by public ferry transport.

Southern Gothenburg Archipelago
Islands of Västra Götaland County